Lane is an unincorporated community and census-designated place in Atoka County, Oklahoma, United States. 

A post office was established at Lane, Indian Territory on October 6, 1902.  Its name reflects the fact the new post office was located in a building which was at the end of lane bounded by rail fencing.  At the time of its founding, Lane was located in Atoka County, Choctaw Nation, a territorial-era government unit.

As of the 2010 census, the CDP had a population of 414.

The famous rodeo world champion Lane Frost (1963-1989) once lived in Lane, as do his parents. Frost graduated from high school in Atoka.

Demographics

References

Census-designated places in Atoka County, Oklahoma
Census-designated places in Oklahoma